Sabal domingensis, the Hispaniola palmetto, is a species of palm which is native to Hispaniola (in both the Dominican Republic and Haiti) and Cuba.

Description
Plants have 20–30 leaves, each with about 90 leaflets. The inflorescences, which are branched, arching and at least as long as the leaves, bear pear-shaped, black fruit.

Common names
In English, Sabal domingensis is known as the "Hispaniola palmetto", "Hispaniola palm", or "Dominican palm". In Spanish, it is known (along with Sabal causiarum) as palma cana in the Dominican Republic, and in Haitian Creole as latanier-chapeau.

Distribution
Sabal domingensis is found from northwest Haiti to the central Dominican Republic on Hispaniola, and is also present in Cuba.

Uses
The leaves are used for thatch and to weave a variety of items including hats, baskets and mats.

Etymology
The species has been given the specific epithet domingensis, as it occurs on the island of Hispaniola; the island was historically called Santo Domingo, or Saint-Domingue.

References

External links
Sabal Domingensis Info Floridata

domingensis
Trees of Haiti 
Trees of the Dominican Republic 
Trees of Cuba
Plants described in 1908
Taxa named by Odoardo Beccari